STS-30 was the 29th NASA Space Shuttle mission and the fourth mission for Space Shuttle Atlantis. It was the fourth shuttle launch since the Challenger disaster and the first shuttle mission since the disaster to have a female astronaut on board. The mission launched from Kennedy Space Center, Florida, on May 4, 1989, and landed four days later on May 8, 1989. During the mission, Atlantis deployed the Venus-bound Magellan probe into orbit.

The mission was officially designated STS-30R as the original STS-30 designator belonged to STS-61-A, the 22nd Space Shuttle mission. Official documentation for that mission contained the designator STS-30 throughout. As STS-51-L was designated STS-33, future flights with the STS-26 through STS-33 designators would require the R in their documentation to avoid conflicts in tracking data from one mission to another.

Crew

Crew seating arrangements

Shuttle processing 
Atlantis spent three months in the Orbiter Processing Facility (OPF-2) after returning to the Kennedy Space Center at the end of STS-27. During this period technicians got to work removing and replacing all of the damaged Thermal Protection System (TPS) tiles that Atlantis sustained during her prior flight. They also took detailed inspections of the shuttle while simultaneously preparing Atlantis for STS-30R. The shuttle was rolled over to the Vehicle Assembly Building and mated with ET-29 and an SRB set on March 11, 1989. Eleven days later on March 22, 1989, Atlantis was rolled out to launch pad 39B.

Mission summary 

Space Shuttle Atlantis lifted off from Launch Complex 39B at Kennedy Space Center (KSC), Florida, at 14:46:59 EDT on May 4, 1989. The primary payload, the Magellan spacecraft with its attached Inertial Upper Stage (IUS), was successfully deployed later that day. Magellan was the first American planetary mission in 11 years.

The launch was originally scheduled for April 28, 1989, the first day of a 31-day launch period when Earth and Venus were properly aligned. However, the liftoff was scrubbed at T-31 seconds because of a problem with the liquid hydrogen recirculation pump on Space Shuttle Main Engine (SSME) No. 1, and a vapor leak in the liquid hydrogen recirculation line between the orbiter and external tank (ET). On the rescheduled liftoff date of May 4, 1989, the launch was again delayed until the final five minutes of the launch window due to cloud cover and excessive crosswinds at KSC's Shuttle Landing Facility (SLF). Good landing conditions were required at the SLF in case of a Return To Launch Site (RTLS) abort early in the flight.

The only major glitch during the flight occurred on May 7, 1989, when one of the four general-purpose computers programmed to operate the orbiter failed. The shuttle crew replaced the computer, part of a redundant set, with a backup one. It was the first time a computer had been replaced while in orbit. The glitch had no impact on the crew's safety or the primary objectives of the mission, although some of the activities involved in conducting experiments had to be canceled while the crew was replacing the computer. There also was no impact to the mission when one of the three thrusters on Atlantis''' aft right-hand Orbital Maneuvering System (OMS) pod failed during ascent.

However, the STS-30 crew experienced several minor annoyances. A Hasselblad camera used to photograph sites on Earth had to be stowed for the remainder of the mission after a shutter stuck during the crew's third day in space. The Text and Graphics Systems (TAGS), a device to send images and graphics to the orbiter from Mission Control Center, had to be turned off on Flight Day 2 because of a paper jam. Commander Walker and Pilot Grabe had problems with a device used to take measurements of central venous pressure to determine the effects of microgravity on the cardiovascular system. On the second full day in space, the water dispensing system in the galley malfunctioned, causing some difficulties for the crew in preparing meals.Atlantis touched down at Runway 22, Edwards Air Force Base, California, on May 8, 1989, at 15:43:27 EDT. Minutes before landing, the runway had to be switched from 17 to 22 due to high crosswinds. The mission lasted a total of 4days, 0hours, 56minutes, and 28seconds.

 Payload and experiments 
The Magellan spacecraft was deployed from the shuttle's payload bay six hours and 14 minutes into the mission. Two successive IUS propulsion burns placed the spacecraft on its trajectory to Venus about an hour later. Magellan'' arrived at Venus in August 1990 and began a 243-day mission of mapping the planet's surface with radar.

Three mid-deck experiments were included on the mission. All had flown before. Mission Specialist Cleave used a portable laptop computer to operate and monitor the Fluids Experiment Apparatus (FEA). An  video camcorder, flown for the first time on the Shuttle, provided the opportunity for the crew to record and downlink on-orbit activities such as the FEA, which was a joint endeavor between Rockwell International and NASA. Payload bay video cameras were used to record storm systems from orbit as part of the Mesoscale Lightning Experiment.

Wake-up calls 
NASA began a tradition of playing music to astronauts during the Project Gemini, and first used music to awaken a flight crew during Apollo 15. Each track is specially chosen, often by the astronauts' families, and usually has a special meaning to an individual member of the crew, or is applicable to their daily activities.

Gallery

See also 

 List of human spaceflights
 List of Space Shuttle missions

References

External links 
 NASA mission summary 
 STS-30 Video Highlights 

Space Shuttle missions
Edwards Air Force Base
Spacecraft which reentered in 1989
Spacecraft launched in 1989